Frank Feller (1848–1908) was a Swiss artist who settled in England and made a career as an illustrator and painter. He was particularly well known as a painter of military scenes and as a painter of postcards.

Early life
Feller was born on 28 October 1848 in Bümpliz-Oberbottigen, a district of the city of Bern, Switzerland. He trained in Geneva, Munich, Paris, and London.

Settling in England
By 1871 Feller was a boarder at 6 Euston Grove, St Pancras, London with the profession of Artist. Ten years later, in 1881, he was now a naturalised British subject. He was lodging at 9 Rowland Street, St. Pancras, London.

Marriage and family
Feller married Christine Heuser (Q2 186315 June 1930),
 on 19 December 1882 at All Saints' Church in Wandsworth, London. Christine had been born in St. George in the East. Her father, Balthazar Heuser (c. 18328 June 1887), ran a Public House here, the Bee-Hive at 71 Christian Street, Whitechapel, London. Her father was a German immigrant who became a naturalised British citizen in 20 April 1874.
 
The couple had eight children:
 Victor Maximilian Feller (26 February 18861969), became an engineer, married Nellie Lillian Kentish (c. 188211 September 1971), emigrated to Quebec, Canada in c. 1905, and had at least three children.
 Elizabeth Louise Marie Feller (26 Feb 1889), married Fritz Georg Rauschenback (c.1886 ), a German bank clerk working in London, in Hackney, London, in the first quarter of 1912. The couple remained in London until 1914, but it is not known how they were affected by the outbreak of the First World War.
 Margarite Alexandra Christina Feller (21 December 189023 May 1955), who married Charles Chitty Sears (5 February 18781931), a metal merchant's clerk, at the Parish Church in Romford, on 1 September 1914.
 Frank Charles Feller (Q4 1892)
 Gordon Montague Feller (14 June 18971 June 1971), served with the Royal Engineers in the First World War, arrived as an emigrant in Canada on 30 October 1920, and immediately joined Canadian Explosives Ltd, a DuPont Company, as a maintenance technician. He married Florence Alberta Tobin (26 October 189617 December 1971), a US Citizen with a Canadian father in 1924. He was transferred first to the Arlington Company, in New Jersey, the forerunner of the DuPont's plastics department, and later to DuPont's experimental station in Delaware, where he ended his career as a draftsman after nearly forty years with the company.
 Robert Rudolf Balthasar Feller (20 December 189923 December 1958), served in the Royal Air Force in the First World War, Married Mary L. Rogers in Hambledon, Surrey, England in the first quarter of 1932, and was recorded as an off-licence manager in the 1939 register. His youngest sister Louisa was his executrix.
 Louis Sigried Feller (17 October 1902), a master tailor, shared housing with his sister Christina throughout the 1930s. Served as his mother's executor.
 Christina Louisa Feller (14 June 1908), a book-keeper and shorthand-typist, was born after the death of her father. Executrix for her brother Robert Rudolf in 19581959. The electoral registers show her sharing different houses with her brother Louis Sigfried during the 1930s.

By 1891 Feller was living at Hazeldene, Knight's Park, Kingston-on-Thames, and described himself as an Artist: Military Painter. He had moved again by 1895, this time to 13 Fitzroy Street. He again moved to 3 Charleville Road, Fulham, London by 1901. He and Christina now had six children. Christina was now operating a millinery and employing others in her enterprise.

Feller's body of work
Feller's work can be divided up into a number of categories:
 Magazine illustration
 Military paintings
 Book illustration
 Postcards

These categories are not clearly defined and even overlap. Thus many of the magazines illustration and the postcards show military scenes. Book illustration and magazine illustration are not that far apart. However, it is still a useful scheme for looking closely at his body of work.

Magazine illustration
Feller was a contribution to many magazines including:
The Badminton Magazine
Black and White. Thorpe described Feller as a regular but somewhat conventional contributor.
The Boy's Own Paper
The Captain
The Christian Globe
Chums
Good Words
The Idler
The Illustrated Sporting and Dramatic News
The New Budget
The Pall Mall Magazine
Pearson's Magazine
Shurey's Illustrated. Feller was one of the principal illustrators.
Shurey's Pictorial Budget. Feller was one of the principal illustrators.
Society
The Sphere
St Paul's Magazine Thorne referred to some of Feller's double page war drawings as indifferent.
The Strand Magazine

Example of magazine illustration
The July 1894 edition of The Strand Magazine contained an article called Marksmanship by Gilber Guerdon. The eleven page article had twenty illustrations, ten of which are shown here. The magazine used good quality paper, so there was no signs of the problems that plagued some of Feller's book illustrations for G. A. Henty, even though the illustrations were wash drawings rather than just pen and ink. Feller's hologram is used to sign the illustration of William Tell, where on the top half is visible, and on the skirts of the woman running the Coconut Shy, where it is clearly visible. The other illustrations bear his name in full.

Military paintings
Painting and drawing military scenes was one of the mainstays of Fellers's work, and The Sphere captioned his photograph The Military Artist in its coverage of his death. In its obituary, The Boy's Own Paper stated that he would be most remembered for:
The Midnight Charge of Kassassin from the Anglo-Egyptian War of July to September 1882.
The Last Eleven at Maiwand from the Second Anglo-Afghan War of 	18781880.
The Last Grip which shows a British officer, revolver in hand, holding the hand of a dying comrade who is lying on his dead horse in the desert, as three mounted Arabs rush towards him. It appeared as colour reproduction in the 1894 Christmas Number of Black and White.
A Stampede, based on an incident in the Second Anglo-Boer War
Custer's Last Charge, from the Battle of the Little Bighorn 25–26 June 1876.
The Old Flag, an imaginary incident in the Second Anglo-Boer War on which Lord Roberts, accompanied by all the Generals, received the plaudits of a representative detachment of the British Army."
No Surrender, was not a painting that the Boy's Own Paper listed, but it is the only one of his painting currently in public collections in the UK. This shows the aftermath of the Battle of Magersfontein (11 December 1899) in the Second Anglo-Boer War where the Highland Brigade was order to attack a Boer position without any worthwhile prior reconnaissance.

In 1882 Feller completed what is probably his most famous work, The Last Eleven at Maiwand. It depicted the last eleven men from the 66th (Berkshire) Regiment of Foot with their regimental mascot, "Bobby", making a last stand as Afghan horseman approach. The original painting has disappeared,  but is known from the print published by Henry Graves in April 1884. The painting was unusual in that it was a watercolour of seven feet (over two metres) in length. The painting received a lot of favourable critical attention:
. . . executed with all the vigour and realism so necessary in a battle-picture.The Daily News
. . . has evidently special special capacity for dealing with battle scenes, as well as great skill with his pencil.Hampshire Advertiser
Never was any artist more worthy of recognition than he . . .Perthshire Constitutional
The figures . . . are well drawn na effectively grouped. They are life-like in action . . .The Morning Post 
However Beckett considers the painting to be less skilled than Richard Caton Woodville's Saving the guns at Maiwand.
 
After his success with The last eleven Feller exhibited at the Royal Academy with:
Outpost (1883)
Bushey Park (1887)
Faithful to the last (1895)

Book illustration
1881 was also when he did his first book illustrations. These were for Gipsy Mike or, Firm as a Rock published by John F. Shaw and Co., London, and G. A. Henty's Out on the Pampas. While the illustrations for Gipsy Mike were pen and ink drawings, those for Out on the Pampas were wash-drawings. Unfortunately these drawings . . . were poorly reproduced by halftone blocks made with too fine a screen for the paper they were printed on." Feller was one of two illustrators whose work for Henty suffered the most from being printed on paper that was too low a quality for the fineness of halftone bocks used.

No complete list of books illustrated by Feller is available. Even comprehensive catalogues such as the Jisc Library Hub Discover have gaps as the names of illustrators are not always recorded when cataloguing even where the publishers provide that information.
 
However by using Jisc, Abe Books, and newspaper archives, it is possible to build a partial list of authors whose work was illustrated by Feller. These include:
Phoebe Allen (18581933), a prolific English writer who wrote novels, juvenile fiction, and popular introductions to a range of topics.
James Francis Cobb (18291903), an English banker and author, mainly of historical juvenile fiction.
Oswald Crawfurd (18341909), an English journalist, author, diplomat and editor, who managed publisher Chapman & Hall, and edited Black and White.
A. Eubule Evans (18391896), an Anglican cleric and popular novelist, including tract novels for the SPCK.
V. L. Going, who wrote at least one work of juvenile fiction set in the Greco-Turkish War (1897), a contributor to Captain and The Boy's Own Paper.
Margaret Scott Haycraft (18551936), a prolific English author whose audience ranged from the very young to strong moral tales.
G. A. Henty (18321902), a prolific writer of boy's adventure fiction, often set in a historical context, who had himself served in the military and been a war correspondent.
John C. Hutcheson (18401897), a British writer about life at sea.
Arthur Lee Knight, an author of nautical and historical juvenile fiction and a contributor to the Boy's Own Paper. Active from the 1880s to the 1920s.
Hugh St. Leger, an English journalist, and author of juvenile fiction, who served both in the Navy and the Army, and drew on his experiences in his books.
Donald McIntyre (18311903), a British general in India, and holder of the Victoria Cross who was active on the frontier with Afghanistan and in suppressing the Indian Mutiny. Wrote one book about wandering and wild-sport beyond the Himalayas.
Lewis Novra (18381892), an English poet and song-writer who lived at 95 Regent Street, London.
Bertie Senior, wrote at least one work of juvenile fiction about a treasure hunt.
Noel West, pseudonym of Mrs. M. B. Cox, who wrote juvenile fiction.
Frederick Whishaw (18541934), a Russian-born British historian, poet, musician, and author of juvenile fiction.

Example of book illustration by Frank Feller
The following example of book illustration by Frank Feller is from one of the first books he illustrated Gipsy Mike; or, Firm as a Rock. (1881) by an anonymous author. It was published by J. F. Shaw & Co. Illustrations by courtesy of the British Library. These illustrations look static when compared with Feller's later work.

Postcards
Feller was well known as a post card artist. His series of card designs for Eyre and Spottiswoode of Sportsmen, Sailors, and Policemen were one of the most popular cards for them in 1881.

Image searches, and the Tuck Database, show that Feller contributed to many different series of postcards including:
Life in Russia (several series)
Life in Spain
In the Alps
In the Tyrol
Angling
Life in China
Life in Switzerland
Cowboys and Indians
Soldiers

Unfortunately Raphael Tuck & Sons, for whom Feller did a great deal of work, had their premises destroyed, together with 40,000 original drawings and all their records, on 29 December 1940, during The Blitz. This naturally limits the number of examples of Feller's work.

Feller also painted postcards for Hildesheimer and Faulkner. The Lancet considered
that his 1885 Christmas Cards featuring mounted Hussars were very effective. The designs had been purchased by the company between November 1883 and November 1884 as it took five to nine months to lithograph and print each set of cards, and the cards had to be available early enough to allow people to send sets to relatives for this use.

Examples of postcards painted by Frank Feller
The following postcards were painted by Frank Feller for Raphael Tuck & Sons. The Olivine logo on the cards was one of Tuck's trademarks, and refers to the type of board used.

Later life
Feller was living at 8 Wetherby Terrace, Earls Court, London, when he died from a heart attack on 6 March 1908. Both The Sphere and the Boys' Own Paper carried obituaries, the first of these with a photograph. His estate was valued at £500 7s. 6d. and his widow Christina was his executor. His widow was left looking after 5 minor children, the last of which, Louise, was born after the death of her father. By 1910, Christina was managing the Duke William of Cumberland public house (called the Duke William Hotel in the census returns) This had been her father's occupation. She remained there until at least 1914.

Christina married Sydney John South Allen at Brentford in the first quarter of 1913. She died at Willesden General Hospital on 15 June 1930. Her youngest son, Louis Siegfried, was her executor, for an estate valued at only £85 14s.

Notes

References
 Harrington, Peter (1993). British Artists and War: The Face of Battle in Paintings and Prints, 1700–1914. London: Greenhill.

External links
 
 
 No Surrender at the Black Watch Castle and Museum via ArtUK

Swiss war artists
19th-century Swiss painters
Swiss male painters
20th-century Swiss painters
Swiss illustrators
British war artists
1848 births
1908 deaths
19th-century Swiss male artists
20th-century Swiss male artists